In Love and War, is a studio album collaborated by rapper Francis Magalona (release posthumously for him), and Eraserheads and Pupil vocalist Ely Buendia. It has 10 tracks and released under Sony Music Philippines, Inc. & Musiko Records in 2010. It also features a cover of the song "Bus Stop", originally by The Hollies and It's All Right, Ma (I'm Only Bleeding) by Bob Dylan.

Track listing

Awards
The album has garnered various nominations from the 2010 NU Rock Awards.

References

External links
Album packaging
http://www.fhm.com.ph/entertainment/music/article/2558 Fhm.com

2010 albums
Ely Buendia albums
Francis Magalona albums